Eshetu Tura ((born January 19, 1950) is an Ethiopian retired long-distance runner from Ethiopia. He won the bronze medal in 3,000 metres steeplechase at the 1980 Summer Olympics.

Career
Tura won a silver medal behind Kip Rono at the first African Championships in 1979. In the 1982 edition, he won the steeplechase competition as well as a silver in 5000 metres.

Tura is currently working as a steeplechase coach for the Ethiopian national athletics team, where he also served as a coach for the late Somalian middle-distance athlete Samia Yusuf Omar.

Achievements

References

External links

1950 births
Living people
Ethiopian male long-distance runners
Ethiopian male steeplechase runners
Olympic athletes of Ethiopia
Athletes (track and field) at the 1980 Summer Olympics
Olympic bronze medalists for Ethiopia
Ethiopian athletics coaches
World Athletics Championships athletes for Ethiopia
Medalists at the 1980 Summer Olympics
Olympic bronze medalists in athletics (track and field)
20th-century Ethiopian people
21st-century Ethiopian people